The order Poduromorpha is one of the three main groups of springtails (Collembola), tiny hexapods related to insects. This group was formerly treated as a superfamily Poduroidea.

They can be best distinguished from the other springtail groups by their body shape. The Symphypleona are very round animals, almost spherical and the abdominal segments are not visible.  Both Entomobryomorpha and Poduromorpha are long springtails with six visible abdominal segments. While Entomobryomorpha have the first thorax segment reduced, Poduromorpha retain all three.  The Poduromorpha also tend to have short legs and a plump body, but more oval in shape than the Symphypleona. Their name means ‘foot tail formed’, deriving from their short, flat, furcula.

Systematics
The Poduromorpha were, as Poduroidea, united with the Entomobryomorpha (then called Entomobryoidea) in a group called "Arthropleona", but this has more recently turned out to be paraphyletic. Actually the Entomobryomorpha, the Poduromorpha, and the third springtail lineage – the Symphypleona – are equally distinct from each other. Their treatment at equal taxonomic rank reflects this. Their rank has also varied a bit. When the springtails were still believed to be an order of insects, the "Arthropleona" and the Symphypleona were treated as suborders.

List of families
Includes fossil families.

Superfamily Neanuroidea
 Family Brachystomellidae
 Family Neanuridae

 Family Odontellidae
Superfamily Poduroidea
 Family Poduridae
Superfamily Hypogastruroidea
 Family Hypogastruridae
 Family Pachytullbergiidae
 Family Paleotullbergiidae
Superfamily Gulgastruroidea
 Family Gulgastruridae
Superfamily Onychiuroidea
 Family Onychiuridae
 Family Tullbergiidae
Superfamily Isotogastruroidea
 Family Isotogastruridae

Footnotes

 
Arthropod orders